

VozMob or Mobile Voices/Voces Móviles (est. 2010) is an open-source "mobile media project that supports immigrant and low wage workers in the Los Angeles area in the documentation of their own stories and communities." It is "specifically aimed at those on the dark side of the digital divide." It enables people with cellphone access to send content to an internet site, and to communicate to a larger audience.

It began as a participatory design project of the Institute of Popular Education of Southern California and the University of Southern California. Other affiliates include the Los Angeles Community Action Network.

Story contributors record video, photos and audio content, and then "send their dispatches by phone to an email address, which directly uploads the messages to Vozmob's blog." The "VozMob content management system is a customized version of Drupal."

See also
 Media in Los Angeles
 Mobile reporting
 Digital storytelling

References

Further reading
 Esmeralda Bermudez. "Giving immigrant laborers an online voice: a new program teaches workers to use cellphones to tell their own stories and to document their lives and work." Los Angeles Times, September 19, 2010
 Philip M. Napoli and Minna Aslama, eds. "Mobile Voices: Projecting the Voices of Immigrant Workers by Appropriating Mobile Phones for Popular Communication: The VozMob Project." Communications Research in Action: Scholar-Activist Collaborations for a Democratic Public Sphere. New York: Fordham University Press, 2011

External links
 VozMob website
 VozMob code
 VozMob wiki and issue tracker

Citizen media
Citizen mass media in California
Mass media in Los Angeles
Immigration to the United States
Free software projects
Internet properties established in 2010